Jordanita hector is a moth of the family Zygaenidae. It is known from southern Turkey and Lebanon.

The length of the forewings is 13–14 mm for males and 9.5–12 mm for females. Adults are on wing at the end of May.

The larvae probably feed on Centaurea cheirolopha.

References
C. M. Naumann, W. G. Tremewan: The Western Palaearctic Zygaenidae. Apollo Books, Stenstrup 1999,

External links
Barcode of Life Data Systems (BOLD)

Procridinae
Insects of Turkey
Moths described in 1907